The North British-Harrogate Tournament was a professional golf tournament played in Harrogate, Yorkshire, England. It was played annually from 1947 to 1952. Total prize money was £2100. From 1947 to 1949 there were two qualifying rounds on two courses before the 72-hole event. There was a cut after 36 holes. From 1950 to 1952 the tournament was extended to 90 holes. Two courses were used on the first two days after which there was a cut. there was a further cut after three rounds.

In 1953 the sponsor changed and the event was known as the Swallow-Harrogate Tournament. The sponsor was Swallow Raincoats. The format was also changed. There was a 36-hole qualifying stage over two courses on the first two days. the leading 64 players qualified and played six rounds of knockout 18-hole match-play on the next three days. Total prize money remained at £2100.

The 1954 event was played in two distinct parts with separate prize money. There was a 72-hole stroke-play event with £1500 prize money. The leading 16 then played knockout match-play over the next two days. This second stage had prize money of £600, so that the total prize money remained at £2100.

In 1955 Swallow Raincoats switched their sponsorship to the Penfold Tournament which became known as the Swallow-Penfold Tournament. The 1955 event had a first prize of £1000 out of total prize money of £4000.

Winners

From 1950 to 1952 the tournament was played over 90 holes. In 1950 one round was played at Oakdale Golf Club. In 1951 one round was played at Pannal Golf Club. In 1952 one round was played at Harrogate Golf Club. In the stroke play stage of the 1954 event, one round was played at Pannal Golf Club.

References

Golf tournaments in England
Recurring sporting events established in 1947
Recurring events disestablished in 1952
1947 establishments in England
1952 disestablishments in England